Tan Song Hwa (born 28 July 1986) is a Malaysian athlete who specialises in hammer throw. Her personal best is 58.71m, achieved on 15 June 2011 at Szombathely, Hungary. Tan won the women's hammer throw gold medal at the 2009 Southeast Asian Games.

In 2011 SEA Games, in spite of pain due to a back injury, Tan retained her gold medal in the women’s Hammer Throw which she won in the 2009 edition in Laos. She hurled the implement a distance of 55.15m.

References

Living people
Malaysian hammer throwers
Southeast Asian Games medalists in athletics
1986 births
Place of birth missing (living people)
Southeast Asian Games gold medalists for Malaysia
Competitors at the 2009 Southeast Asian Games
Competitors at the 2011 Southeast Asian Games